Buscarello de Ghizolfi, or Buscarel of Gisolfe, was a European who settled in Persia in the 13th century while it was part of the Mongol Ilkhanate. He was a Mongol ambassador to Europe from 1289 to 1305, serving the Mongol rulers Arghun, Ghazan and then Oljeitu. The goal of the communications was to form a Franco-Mongol alliance between the Mongols and the Europeans against the Muslims, but despite many back and forth communications, the attempts were never successful.

Biography
Little is known of Buscarello except for his work as an ambassador, and that he was a member of the powerful Ghisolfi family. The first mention of him is in 1274, in relation to the arming of a galley. The next is from 1279, which records that he was in the city of Ayas in Cilician Armenia, at the time a vassal state of the Mongol Empire. He then entered the service of the Mongol ruler Arghun, becoming Officer of his guard, with the title of Qortchi ("Quiver carrier").

Buscarello had a son, Argone de Ghizolfi, whom he named "Arghun" after his patron.

Ambassador
In 1289, Arghun sent a mission to Europe, with Buscarel as ambassador. Other adventurers, such as Tommaso Ugi di Siena and Isol the Pisan, are known to have played similar roles at the Mongol court, as hundreds of Western adventurers entered into the service of Mongol rulers.  Buscarel's journey was the third attempt by Arghun to form an alliance with the Europeans.

Buscarel was in Rome between 15 July and 30 September 1289, and in Paris in November–December 1289. Via Buscarel, Arghun informed the European nobles, such as King Philip IV of France and Edward I of England, that Arghun would march his troops as soon as the Crusaders had disembarked at Saint-Jean-d'Acre, and that the Mongols would deliver between 20,000 and 30,000 horses and all needed supplies to the Crusaders if they would come to the Holy Land. Arghun also promised that he would deliver Jerusalem to the Europeans if Egypt was successfully conquered:

Buscarello also remitted to Philip a memorandum in French describing the details of the proposed combined action:

Buscarel then travelled to England to bring Arghun's message to Edward I, arriving in London on 5 January 1290. Edward answered enthusiastically to the project, but deferred the decision about the date to the Pope, failing to make a clear commitment.

After his meeting with Edward, Buscarello returned to Persia, accompanied by the English envoy Sir Geoffrey de Langley.

Buscarel made multiple other trips back and forth between the Ilkhanate and Europe, acting as an ambassador for various Mongol rulers in turn.  He represented Ghazan in 1303, carrying a message which reiterated Hulagu's promise that the Mongols would give Jerusalem to the Franks in exchange for help against the Muslim Mamluks. In 1303, the Mongols did attempt to invade Syria in great strength (about 80,000 troops), but were defeated at Homs on 30 March 1303, and at the decisive Battle of Shaqhab, south of Damascus, on 21 April 1303. It is considered to be the last major Mongol invasion of Syria.

1305 embassy

In April 1305, Ghazan's successor Oljeitu sent letters to King Philip IV of France, the Pope, and Edward I of England, again through an embassy by Buscarel, who himself wrote a translation of Oljeitu's letter. The message explained that internal conflicts between the Mongols were over, and promised the delivery of 100,000 horses to the Crusaders upon their arrival in the Holy Land. Also, as had the previous Ilkhanate rulers, Oljeitu offered a military collaboration between the Christian nations of Europe and the Mongols against the Mamluks, but again, the attempts at forming an alliance were unsuccessful.

Notes

References

External links
Buscarello de Ghizolfi (article by Jean Richard)

Medieval Italian diplomats
13th-century Italian Jews
Christians of the Crusades
13th-century births
Year of death missing
People of the Ilkhanate
13th-century Italian people